Grinyovka is a rural locality in Starobelitsky Selsoviet Rural Settlement, Konyshyovsky District, Kursk Oblast, Russia. Population:

Geography 
The village is located 51 km from the Russia–Ukraine border, 79 km north-west of Kursk, 21 km north-west of the district center – the urban-type settlement Konyshyovka, 4 km from the selsoviet center – Staraya Belitsa.

 Climate
Grinyovka has a warm-summer humid continental climate (Dfb in the Köppen climate classification).

Transport 
Grinyovka is located 43 km from the federal route  Ukraine Highway, 50 km from the route  Crimea Highway, 19 km from the route  (Trosna – M3 highway), 9 km from the road of regional importance  (Fatezh – Dmitriyev), 17.5 km from the road  (Konyshyovka – Zhigayevo – 38K-038), 6 km from the road  (Dmitriyev – Beryoza – Menshikovo – Khomutovka), 5 km from the road of intermunicipal significance  (38N-144 – Oleshenka with the access road to Naumovka), on the road  (38N-146 – Staraya Belitsa – Bely Klyuch – Grinyovka), 2.5 km from the nearest railway halt 536 km (railway line Navlya – Lgov-Kiyevsky).

The rural locality is situated 85 km from Kursk Vostochny Airport, 180 km from Belgorod International Airport and 284 km from Voronezh Peter the Great Airport.

References

Notes

Sources

Rural localities in Konyshyovsky District